WCEI-FM (96.7 FM, "96.7 WCEI") is a commercial FM radio station broadcasting an adult contemporary format. Licensed to serve Easton, Maryland, United States, the station is owned by Forever Media, through licensee FM Radio Licenses, LLC. Although WCEI is officially licensed to Easton, the station's reach includes even the Baltimore area, as it can be heard clearly in most parts of the city and surrounding areas.

History
The station went on the air as WEMD-FM in 1975 simulcasting its AM sister station WEMD which had a MOR format along with news, farm reports, local happenings, etc. In its beginning WEMD-FM was a 3,000 watt station but sometime in the mid-late 1980s (by this time WCEI-FM) the station asked for a power increase due to the fact that it was an EAS Carrier and needed a more powerful reach and penetration into businesses and homes. The ask was roughly for 10,000 watts but the station was given an increase to a B1- 12,500 watts. On December 21, 1981, the station changed its call sign to the current WCEI to represent the new owners, Clark Enterprises Incorporated, and on August 24, 1985, WCEI-FM became an affiliate of American Top 40 with Casey Kasem.

References

External links

Easton, Maryland
CEI-FM
Mainstream adult contemporary radio stations in the United States
Radio stations established in 1975
1975 establishments in Maryland